A common year starting on Thursday is any non-leap year (i.e. a year with 365 days) that begins on Thursday, 1 January, and ends on Thursday, 31 December. Its dominical letter hence is D. The most recent year of such kind was 2015 and the next one will be 2026 in the Gregorian calendar or, likewise, 2021 and 2027 in the obsolete Julian calendar, see below for more.

This is the only common year with three occurrences of Friday the 13th: those three in this common year occur in February, March, and November. Leap years starting on Sunday share this characteristic, for the months January, April and July. From February until March in this type of year is also the shortest period (one month) that runs between two instances of Friday the 13th.

In this common year, February is a unique rectangle calendar when weeks start on Sundays, Martin Luther King Jr. Day is on January 19, Valentine’s Day is on a Saturday, President's Day is on February 16, Saint Patrick’s Day is on a Tuesday, Memorial Day is on its earliest possible date, May 25, U.S. Independence Day and Halloween are on a Saturday, Labor Day is on its latest possible date, September 7, Thanksgiving is on November 26, and Christmas is on a Friday. This common year is also the only one where Memorial Day and Labor Day are not 14 weeks (98 days) apart: they are 15 weeks (105 days) apart in this common year. Leap years starting on Wednesday share this characteristic.

Calendars

Applicable years

Gregorian Calendar 
In the (currently used) Gregorian calendar, alongside Tuesday, the fourteen types of year (seven common, seven leap) repeat in a 400-year cycle (20871 weeks). Forty-four common years per cycle or exactly 11% start on a Thursday. The 28-year sub-cycle only spans across century years divisible by 400, e.g. 1600, 2000, and 2400.

400 year cycle

century 1:  9, 15, 26, 37, 43, 54, 65, 71, 82, 93, 99

century 2:  105, 111, 122, 133, 139, 150, 161, 167, 178, 189, 195

century 3:  201, 207, 218, 229, 235, 246, 257, 263, 274, 285, 291

century 4:  303, 314, 325, 331, 342, 353, 359, 370, 381, 387, 398

Julian Calendar 
In the now-obsolete Julian calendar, the fourteen types of year (seven common, seven leap) repeat in a 28-year cycle (1461 weeks). A leap year has two adjoining dominical letters (one for January and February and the other for March to December, as 29 February has no letter). This sequence occurs exactly once within a cycle, and every common letter thrice.

As the Julian calendar repeats after 28 years that means it will also repeat after 700 years, i.e. 25 cycles. The year's position in the cycle is given by the formula ((year + 8) mod 28) + 1). Years 3, 14 and 20 of the cycle are common years beginning on Thursday. 2017 is year 10 of the cycle. Approximately 10.71% of all years are common years beginning on Thursday.

References 

Gregorian calendar
Julian calendar
Thursday